Benderville is an unincorporated community located in the town of Scott, Brown County, Wisconsin, United States.

References

Unincorporated communities in Brown County, Wisconsin
Unincorporated communities in Wisconsin
Green Bay metropolitan area